Sokol Olldashi (17 December 1972 – 20 November 2013) was an Albanian politician.  A member of the Democratic Party of Albania, he was the Minister of Public Works, Transportation and Telecommunications in the cabinet of Sali Berisha.

After the conclusion of the defeat in the parliamentary elections of 23 June 2013, Sokol Olldashi ran for the office of the chairman of the Democratic Party, after the resignation of its leader Sali Berisha. He lost the elections for party leadership to incumbent leader of the Democratic Party, Lulzim Basha.

He died on 20 November 2013 in a car accident in the outskirts of Tirana.

References

External links
Biographical data from the Albanian government (in Albanian)

1972 births
2013 deaths
Democratic Party of Albania politicians
Government ministers of Albania
Transport ministers of Albania
People from Durrës
Road incident deaths in Albania
21st-century Albanian politicians